Finland has a long history of beer dating back to the Middle Ages. The oldest still-existing commercial brewery in Finland and Nordic countries is Sinebrychoff, founded in 1819. The Finnish Beer Day is celebrated on 13 October to commemorate the founding of the Sinebrychoff brewery and the birth of Finnish beer. The largest Finnish brewers are Hartwall, Olvi and Sinebrychoff. Most of the beers brewed in Finland are pale lagers. Finland's standing is 9th in per capita consumption of beer. Finnish people consume a total of 440 ML of beer annually and the trend is increasing by 11.7 633 mL bottles year-on-year per capita.

Sahti 

Sahti is a traditional Finnish farmhouse ale, made mostly with rye and barley malts, but sometimes also oats, and filtered through straw or juniper twigs. The modern version has a distinct banana flavor from the bread yeast used to ferment it. It was often praised in the writings of the beer connoisseur Michael Jackson. Although less common today, it is still served at weddings and other special occasions. There are also a few commercial producers.

Finnish beer tax-classes 
Beer was classified into tax classes by law in Finland until the year 1995 when Finland joined the European Union. After joining EU the law was reformed so that the tax is set directly by the percentage of alcohol by volume contained in the product: with 0.5-2.8% beers €0.02/cl of alcohol, with beers over 2.8% €0.0214/cl. However, the old classifications are still voluntarily used widely and the old tax classes are still often marked on the products and advertisements.

Beer with an alcohol content of 5.6% or higher may only be sold in state-owned Alko liquor stores or bars and restaurants with the appropriate license. It is also sold in tax free shops on Baltic Sea cruiseferries. Because of tax regulations, the tax free shops may only be open when the ships are either on international waters or visiting Åland (which has special exempt status in the EU).

Finnish beer market 

Finland's beer market has been described as international rather than local. The market leader is Denmark's Carlsberg Group, owner of the Finnish brewery Sinebrychoff, with a market share of 46.9%. Its beer brands include Koff and Karhu. Carlsberg is followed by Heineken International, which controls - through its Hartwall brewery - a 29.5% share of the national market and produces the Lapin Kulta and Karjala brands. Olvi is the largest Finnish-owned brewery, holding approximately a further 20% of the Finnish market. The rest of the Finnish breweries are smallish regionals or microbreweries, all founded post-1985. , there are 85 microbreweries in the country. Craft breweries are allowed to sell their products directly to consumers.

Prohibition 

Prohibition started in Finland on 1 June 1919 and lasted nearly 13 years, during which the production, import, sales, transportation and storage of alcohol products was only allowed for medicinal, scientific, and technical purposes. A referendum on the continuation of prohibition was held starting on the 29th and closing on 30 December 1931. The referendum closed with a 70% majority against the law and resulted in the end of prohibition on 5 April 1932 at 10:00 when the new state-owned alcohol retail stores opened their doors to customers.

Finnish breweries 

 Auran panimo
 Bock (brewery)
 Bock's Corner Brewery (brewery)
 Brewcats
 C. A. Robsahmin Portteripanimo (sold in 1895)
 CoolHead Brew
 Fat Lizard
 Finlandia Sahti
 Fiskarsin Panimo
 Haapala Brewery
 Hailuodon panimo
 Hartwall (Karjala)
 Lapin Kulta (owned by Hartwall) 
 Hiisi
 Honkavuori
 Hopping Brewsters Beer Company
 Iso-Kallan Panimo
 Kahakka
 Kakola Brewing Company
 Kaleva Brewing Company
Keudan panimo
 Kiiski
 Koskipanimo
 Kotkan Höyrypanimo
 Kvarken
 Laitilan Wirvoitusjuomatehdas (Kukko)
 Lammin Sahti
 Lapin Voima
 Linden Brewery
 Maistila
 Maku Brewing
 Mallaskoski (Kuohu, Häjy, Komia, Makia)
 Mallaskuun panimo
 Malmgårdin Panimo
 Narvan kyläpanimo
 Nokian Panimo (Keisari, Året Runt)
 Olaf
 Olarin Panimo
 Olutpaja
 Olvi (Olvi, Sandels)
 Palvasalmi (bankrupt)
 Panimo Honkavuori
  (Amerikan Serkku, Metsän Henki, Munkintie)
 Ruosniemen panimo
 Saimaan Olut (Saimaa), Marsalkka, Rokrammi, Luostari
 Sinebrychoff (Karhu, Koff)
 Porin panimo (owned by Sinebrychoff)
 Pyynikin käsityöläispanimo
 Sonnisaaren panimo
 Stadin Panimo
 Suomenlinnan Panimo
 Taiwalkosken panimo
 Takatalo & Tompuri Brewery
 Tampere Brewing & Distilling Co
 Teerenpeli
 Tuju
 Ylikylä Olut
 Ålands Bryggeri (Stallhagen)

Finnish brewery restaurants 
 Bock's Corner Brewery (Vaasa)
 Haapala Panimoravintola (Sotkamo)
 Hollolan Hirvi (Hollola)
 Panimoravintola Beer Hunter's (Pori)
 Panimoravintola Bruuveri (Helsinki)
 Panimoravintola Huvila (Savonlinna)
 Panimoravintola Koulu (Turku)
 Panimoravintola Plevna (Tampere)
 Perho (Helsinki)
 Ravintola Herman (no longer brewing)
 Teerenpeli Panimo & Tislaamo (Lahti)

Most important Finnish beers 

 Karhu
 Karjala
 Koff
 Lapin Kulta
 Olvi
 Olaf
 Sandels
 Kukko

Annual Finnish beer events 
 Helsinki Beer Festival (held since 1997)
 Isojano-tapahtuma (held since 1993)
 Olutfestivaalit (held since 1990)
 Sahdinvalmistuksen SM-kisat (Finnish sahti brewing championships, held since 1992)
 Suomalaiset sahtipäivät (held since 1995)
 Suuret oluet – pienet panimot (held since 2003)
 Kaljakellunta (held since 1997)

See also 

 Alcohol preferences in Europe
 Beer and breweries by region
 Sahti, traditional Finnish beer
 Pantsdrunk

References

 
Finnish cuisine